Grégory Vignal (born 19 July 1981) is a French football coach and former professional player who is a coach at Dundee.

A left back, Vignal played in the top division in five countries – England, France, Spain, Scotland and Greece – and in the second tier in a sixth, Germany, although he never played in more than 30 league games for any club. At international level, he represented France at under-20 level in the 2001 FIFA World Youth Championship and has also been capped at under-21 level.

He was head coach of Scottish Women's Premier League club Rangers until 2020, and worked in Marseille's academy before returning to Scotland as a coach at Dundee.

Early life
Grégory Vignal was born on 19 July 1981 in Montpellier, Hérault.

Playing career

Liverpool and loans
Born in Montpellier, Vignal began his career at his home-town club, Montpellier. He soon established a reputation as a promising young player, and was signed by Liverpool in September 2000 for £500,000. He immediately impressed in his first reserve team outings and made his first team debut against Rotherham United in the FA Cup. He went on to make a further six appearances during the 2000–01 season.

Vignal returned for the following season having featured in the World Youth Championship with the France Under-18 squad, and staked his claim for the left-back spot with some impressive performances at the start of the 2001–02 season. However, he found it hard to displace the reliable and experienced John Arne Riise. He went on to make nine appearances that season.

He made just four appearances during the first half of the 2002–03 season and was loaned to Bastia for the remainder of the campaign on 11 January 2003.

During the 2003–04 campaign Vignal was again loaned out to Rennes for the first half of the season, and to Espanyol for the latter half.

Vignal had a season in Scotland at Rangers as the club regained the Scottish Premier League title, playing 42 games and picking up a Scottish League Cup winner's medal as well as the league title.

Portsmouth
At the end of the 2004–05 season Vignal's Liverpool contract expired, and with him available on a free transfer Rangers wanted him to sign a permanent contract with them; however, he failed to agree terms, instead opting to move to Portsmouth. He was then released from Portsmouth after failing to impress Harry Redknapp on his return in the 2005–06 season.

RC Lens and loans
Vignal then moved to Lens on a free transfer and was loaned out to 1. FC Kaiserslautern for the second half of the season in January 2007.

After a trial with the club, Vignal joined Southampton on a season-long loan on 27 July 2007. He scored his first goal for Southampton with a free kick in a 2–0 win over Leicester City in the FA Cup, and his first league goal came from a penalty against Scunthorpe United while playing with a broken arm. He scored another penalty in the 2–2 draw with Wolverhampton Wanderers before being sent off for an off-the-ball incident. However, he later won an appeal against the card. He scored four goals from 23 appearances in the 2007–08 season.

During the summer of 2009, Vignal had a trial with Queens Park Rangers which did not bring the offer of a contract.

Birmingham City and later career
Vignal then played in a friendly match against Sporting Gijón as part of a trial with Birmingham City, newly promoted to the Premier League. After producing what manager Alex McLeish described as a "strong performance", Vignal signed a one-year contract with the club, with an option for a further year, subject to medical examination. Injury disrupted his season, which combined with the form of Liam Ridgewell at left-back restricted the player to just nine first-team appearances. The club chose not to take up the option of a second year.

In July 2010, Vignal had trials with Sheffield United and Cardiff City. In September 2010, he joined Atromitos. He then left the Athens club in December 2010.

On 12 September 2012, Vignal signed a contract with Scottish Premier League club Dundee United until January 2013, but left in November without having made a first-team appearance. He returned to France, where he signed for CFA (fourth-tier) club AS Béziers ahead of the 2013–14 season.

Coaching career
After a period working with Rangers as a coach for their youth academy teams, in July 2019 Vignal was appointed head coach of the club's senior women's team with the incumbent Amy McDonald moving to a role as the overall women's section manager. He left Rangers in August 2020 for a seven-month spell with Olympique de Marseille's academy, and then returned to Scotland where, in November 2021, he was working as an assistant under-18s coach with Dundee.

Honours
Liverpool
FA Cup: 2000–01
UEFA Cup: 2000–01
UEFA Super Cup: 2001

Rangers
Scottish League Cup: 2004–05
Scottish Premier League: 2004–05

Lens
Ligue 2: 2008–09

France U18
UEFA European Under-18 Championship: 2000

References

External links

1981 births
Living people
Footballers from Montpellier
French footballers
Association football defenders
Castelnau Le Crès FC players
Montpellier HSC players
Liverpool F.C. players
SC Bastia players
Stade Rennais F.C. players
RCD Espanyol footballers
Rangers F.C. players
Portsmouth F.C. players
RC Lens players
1. FC Kaiserslautern players
Southampton F.C. players
Birmingham City F.C. players
Atromitos F.C. players
Dundee United F.C. players
AS Béziers (2007) players
Premier League players
Ligue 1 players
La Liga players
Scottish Premier League players
English Football League players
Super League Greece players
UEFA Europa League winning players
France youth international footballers
France under-21 international footballers
French expatriate footballers
Expatriate footballers in England
Expatriate footballers in Germany
Expatriate footballers in Greece
Expatriate footballers in Scotland
Expatriate footballers in Spain
French expatriate sportspeople in England
French expatriate sportspeople in Germany
French expatriate sportspeople in Greece
French expatriate sportspeople in Scotland
French expatriate sportspeople in Spain
French football managers
Women's association football managers
Rangers W.F.C. managers
Scottish Women's Premier League managers
Association football coaches
Rangers F.C. non-playing staff
Olympique de Marseille non-playing staff
Dundee F.C. non-playing staff